Adamant in classical mythology is an archaic form of diamond. In fact, the English word diamond is ultimately derived from adamas, via Late Latin  and Old French . In ancient Greek , genitive , literally 'unconquerable, untameable'. In those days, the qualities of hard metal (probably steel) were attributed to it, and adamant became as a result an independent concept.

In the Middle Ages adamant also became confused with the magnetic rock lodestone, and a folk etymology connected it with the Latin , 'to love or be attached to'.  Another connection was the belief that adamant (the diamond definition) could block the effects of a magnet.  This was addressed in chapter III of Pseudodoxia Epidemica, for instance.

Since the contemporary word diamond is now used for the hardest gemstone, the increasingly archaic term adamant has been reduced to mostly poetic or anachronistic use. In that capacity, the name, and various derivatives of it, are frequently used in modern media to refer to a variety of fictional substances.

In mythology
 Adamant is used as a translation in the King James Bible  in Ezekiel 3:9 for the word שמיר(Shamir), the original word in the Hebrew Bible. 
 In Greek mythology, Cronus castrated his father Uranus using an adamant sickle given to him by his mother Gaia. An adamantine sickle or sword was also used by the hero Perseus to decapitate the Gorgon Medusa while she slept.
 In the Greek tragedy Prometheus Bound (translated by G. M. Cookson), Hephaestus is to bind Prometheus "to the jagged rocks in adamantine bonds infrangible".
 In Virgil's Aeneid, the gate of Tartarus is framed with pillars of solid adamant, "that no might of man, nay, not even the sons of heaven, could uproot in war"
 In John Milton's epic poem Paradise Lost, adamant or adamantine is mentioned eight times. First in Book 1, Satan is hurled "to bottomless perdition, there to dwell in adamantine chains and penal fire" (lines 47–48). Three times in Book 2 the gates of hell are described as being made of adamantine (lines 436, 646 and 853). In Book 6, Satan "Came towring [sic], armd [sic] in Adamant and Gold" (line 110), his shield is described as "of tenfold adamant" (line 255), and the armor worn by the fallen angels is described as "adamantine" (line 542). Finally in book 10 the metaphorical "Pinns [sic] of Adamant and Chains" (lines 318–319) bind the world to Satan, and thus to sin and death.
 In some versions of the Alexander Romance, Alexander the Great builds walls of Adamantine, the Gates of Alexander, to keep the giants Gog and Magog from pillaging the peaceful southern lands.
 In The Hypostasis of the Archons, Gnostic scripture from the Nag Hammadi Library refers to the Adamantine Land, an incorruptible place 'above' from whence the spirit came to dwell within man so that he became Adam, he who moves upon the ground with a living soul.

In fiction

 In The Divine Comedy by Dante, completed 1320, the angel at purgatory's gate sits on adamant.
 In the Medieval epic poem The Faerie Queene, published 1590, Sir Artegal's sword is made of Adamant.
 In William Shakespeare's A Midsummer Night's Dream (1595/96), Helena says to Demetrius, "You draw me, you hard-hearted adamant!".
 In the Holy Sonnet I, published 1620, John Donne states in line 14, "And thou like adamant draw mine iron heart".
 In the 1726 novel Gulliver's Travels by Jonathan Swift, the base of the fictitious flying island of Laputa (Part III of Gulliver's Travels) is made of Adamant.
 In Princess Ida by Gilbert and Sullivan, first performed 1884, the hardnosed princess's castle is called Castle Adamant.
 In J. R. R. Tolkien's legendarium (The Lord of the Rings published in 1954-5), Nenya, one of the Three Rings of Power, is set with a gem of adamant; the fortress of Barad-dûr is also described as being partly built from "adamant".
 In the 1956 movie Forbidden Planet, Dr. Morbius describes the Krell towers as being made of "glass and porcelain and adamantine steel." 
 In Marvel Comics, adamantium (first appearance: Avengers #66, July 1969) is a nearly indestructible metal that coats the skeleton of the superhero Wolverine and makes up the body of the supervillain Ultron.
 In the tabletop roleplaying game Dungeons and Dragons, Adamantine is an extremely hard exotic metal. Adamantine weapons can easily deal damage to golems and tough inanimate objects.
 In 2002 Saint Seiya'''s novel Saint Seiya – Gigantomachia the Giants of Greek mythology wear adamas armors.
 In the action role-playing game Dragon Age: Inquisition, Adamant Fortress is the name of an ancient Grey Warden keep besieged by the player's forces.
 In The Fate of Atlantis DLC for the action role-playing video game Assassin's Creed Odyssey, adamant is a nearly indestructible resource used by an ancient Precursor civilization to build and power the Pieces of Eden.
 In the construction and management simulation game Dwarf Fortress, Adamantine is a rarely found material used to craft many objects, including weapons and armor. It is one of the most powerful materials in the game.
 In the manga and anime series Inuyasha, one of the titular character's special moves is known as "Kongōsōha" (金剛槍破), translated into English as "Adamant Barrage" or the "Spears of Adamant". It is unleashed through Inuyasha's sword Tessaiga and spurts out thousands of tough diamond shards at the target. The use of the word "Adamant" in the English translation might be due to the show's setting being set in the Warring States Period of Japan, alluding towards the ancient name of "diamond".
 In the His Dark Materials trilogy by Philip Pullman, in the third book, The Amber Spyglass (2000), Lord Asriel's tower is made of adamant.
 The massively-multiplayer online RPG RuneScape has adamantite as a greenish, high-level minable ore that can be smelted into bars and crafted into weapons.
 In the manga and anime series Record of Ragnarok the fictional god of conquest Adamas derives his name from the Greek word of the same name. He later goes by Adamantite referring to the indestructible substance from Greek Myth
 In the action-adventure sandbox game Terraria adamantite is a mid-game burgundy colored ore that can be mined and smelted into bars in order to craft various objects like weapons, armors and equipment

See also 
 Adamant (1811 ship)
 Adam Ant, musician
 adamant, a noun defined at Wiktionary
 Adamant, Vermont, a village in Washington County, Vermont, US
 Adamantane, a bulky hydrocarbon
 Adamantine spar, a real mineral
 adamantine, an adjective defined at Wiktionary
 Aggregated diamond nanorods, ultrahard, nanocrystalline form of diamond
 Unobtainium, a name given to exotic, fictional materials used in science fiction
 Adamantina, a Brazilian municipality in the state of São Paulo.
 adamantium, a fictional metal alloy

References 

Fictional metals
Mythological substances